The Dongping Dam is an arch dam on the Zhongjian River, a right tributary of the Qing River, in Xuan'en County, Hubei Province, China. The primary purpose of the dam is hydroelectric power generation and it supports a 110 MW power station consisting of two 55 MW Francis turbine-generators. Construction began in 2000, the first generator was operational in 2005 and the project completed in 2006.

See also

List of dams and reservoirs in China
List of major power stations in Hubei

References

Dams in China
Hydroelectric power stations in Hubei
Arch dams
Dams completed in 2006
Enshi Tujia and Miao Autonomous Prefecture
2006 establishments in China